Bonriki is a settlement on Tarawa atoll, Kiribati, near Temwaiku and is part of the municipality of South Tarawa. It is in the south-east of South Tarawa. Bonriki International Airport, one of two international airports in Kiribati, is located here. One of the first roads linking islands together in Tarawa connects Bonriki to Bikenibeu.

See also 
 Air Kiribati
 Naval Base Tarawa
 List of towns and villages in Kiribati

References 

Populated places in Kiribati
South Tarawa